Claudius Regaud (born 30 January 1870 in Lyons, France; died 29 December 1940 in Couzon-au-Mont-d'Or, France) was a French doctor and biologist, one of the pioneers in radiotherapy at the Curie Institute.

Scientific work
In 1906, Regaud discovered that one of the effects of X-ray treatment is sterility. He deduced that X-rays could also be used against rapidly growing cells other than gametes and, thus, against cancerous tumors. He proceeded to conduct the first experiments in this area. In 1912, at the Curie Institute, he was given responsibility for the Pasteur Laboratory, with the mission to study the biological and medical effects of radioactivity. The Curie laboratory, in contrast, dealt with research in the fields of physics and chemistry.

In addition, he started a program to fight neoplasia and conducted research to determine the optimal duration and dosage for radiation therapy.

References 

French radiologists
Radiation health effects researchers
1870 births
1940 deaths
Physicians from Lyon